Svetlin Dimitrov (born 5 November 1990) is a Bulgarian handballer who plays for C' Chartres Métropole Handball and the Bulgaria national team.

Achievements
Championnat de France Nationale 2:
Winner: 2014

Individual awards
 IHF Emerging Nations Championship 
Top Scorer: 2015, 2017
Best right wing: 2019

References

1990 births
Living people
People from Veliko Tarnovo
Bulgarian male handball players
Expatriate handball players
Bulgarian expatriate sportspeople in France
Sportspeople from Veliko Tarnovo Province